William Carson McBrien (12 January 1889 – 18 June 1954) was a Canadian business owner and civic administrator. He was a long-serving chairman of the Toronto Transportation Commission and oversaw the construction of Canada's first underground rapid transit subway system in Toronto, Ontario.

Biography 
He was born in Orangeville, Ontario and moved to Toronto as a young boy. He began a hardware business at age 15 with his older brother Fred – a future city council alderman and  member of the Ontario Legislature. He served overseas with the Canadian Expeditionary Force in the Great War, rising to the rank of Major in the 12th Battalion, Canadian Railway Troops. On his return to Canada he worked in the real estate business, and became active in civic affairs. He ran in Toronto Southwest B as a Conservative in the 1919 provincial election but lost to Liberal John Ramsden. He served on the Toronto Board of Education as member and Chairman, and later was appointed to the Toronto Harbour Commission. In 1930 he was appointed as one of three members of the Toronto Transportation Commission. He was Chairman of the TTC in 1931-1932, and then from mid-1933 until his death. During the Second World War he served in Canada as a Lieutenant-Colonel commanding a reserve unit of the Royal Canadian Engineers.

He guided the TTC through the difficult years of the Great Depression and the Second World War. He strongly supported the TTC's construction of Canada's first subway, which opened three months before his death. He was chairman during the transformation of the Toronto Transportation Commission from a local transit operator to a regional operator, the Toronto Transit Commission, upon the formation of the Municipality of Metropolitan Toronto in 1954.

The TTC headquarters building at Davisville subway station, opened in 1958, is named the McBrien Building in his honour.

References

1889 births
1954 deaths
Chairs of the Toronto Transit Commission
Canadian Expeditionary Force officers
Canadian Militia officers
Canadian Army officers
Canadian military personnel of World War II
Toronto District School Board trustees